American Artist can refer to:

 American Artist (artist), a new media artist
 American Artist, a sibling publication of The Artist's Magazine